Teluk Datuk was a state constituency in Selangor, Malaysia, that has been represented in the Selangor State Legislative Assembly from 1959 to 1974, from 1995 to 2018. Following the 2018 redelineation, Teluk Datuk has been renamed Banting .

The state constituency was created in the 1958 redistribution and is mandated to return a single member to the Selangor State Legislative Assembly under the first past the post voting system.

History
It was abolished in 1974 when it was redistributed. It was re-created in 1994.

2004–2016: The constituency contains the polling districts of Bukit Kemandul, Seri Cheeding, Kampung Jenjarum, Jenjarum Tempatan Kedua, Jenjarum Tempatan Ketiga, Jenjarum Tempatan Keempat, Kota Seri Langat, Sungai Manggis Utara, Sungai Manggis Selatan, Teluk Datuk, Teluk Bunut, Bukit Cheeding (A).

2016–2018: The constituency contains the polling districts of Bukit Kemandul, Seri Cheeding, Kampung Jenjarum, Jenjarum Tempatan Kedua, Jenjarum Tempatan Ketiga, Jenjarum Tempatan Keempat, Kota Sri Langat, Sungai Manggis Utara, Sungai Manggis Selatan, Teluk Datuk, Teluk Bunut, Bukit Cheeding (A), Bandar Saujana Putra.

Representation history

Election results

References

Defunct Selangor state constituencies